Planinets is a village in the municipality of Ivaylovgrad, in Haskovo Province, in southern Bulgaria.

References

Villages in Haskovo Province